Illinka is an urban-type settlement in the Pokrovsk Raion, Donetsk Oblast (province) of eastern Ukraine. It is part of Kurakhove urban hromada, one of the hromadas of Ukraine. Population:

Demographics
Native language as of the Ukrainian Census of 2001:
 Ukrainian 83.91%
 Russian 16.09%

References

Urban-type settlements in Pokrovsk Raion